Events from the year 2001 in Pakistan.

Incumbents

Federal government
President: Muhammad Rafiq Tarar (until 20 June), Pervez Musharraf (starting 20 June)
Chief Justice: Irshad Hasan Khan

Governors
Governor of Balochistan – Amir-ul-Mulk Mengal
Governor of Khyber Pakhtunkhwa – Iftikhar Hussain Shah 
Governor of Punjab – Muhammad Safdar (until 29 October); Khalid Maqbool (starting 29 October)
Governor of Sindh – Muhammad Mian Soomro

Events

May
23 May – India invites future president Pervez Musharraf to peace talks.
28 May – Musharraf formally accepts the invitation.

July
President Musharraf meets Indian PM Vajpayee in Agra for a three-day summit; the talks fail.

September
The September 11 attacks in America result in Pakistan agreeing to cooperate with the campaign against Al Qaeda.

August
The Pakistan cricket team beats Bangladesh at Multan.

November
Anthrax-infected letters, the first in Asia, are sent to the Karachi office of the Jang newspaper; there are no casualties.

December
India blames an attack on its parliament on Pakistan, leading to a massive build-up of troops on both sides of the border and rising tension between the two nations.

Births
 5 January – Javeria Abbasi, television actress and former female model 
 12 January – Sara Kashif, actress
 22 February – Zuhab Khan, actor

See also
2000 in Pakistan
Other events of 2001
2002 in Pakistan
Timeline of Pakistani history

References

 
Pakistan
Years of the 21st century in Pakistan
2000s in Pakistan